Sunday Jack Akpan (born Ikot Ide Etukudo, 1940) is a Nigerian sculptor who has been described as "the contemporary African equivalent of the medieval artisan".  He is most famous for his work in cement, in which he crafts traditional-style statues of tribal leaders and other figures, mainly as grave art, which he then paints; he has also created other types of commercial art, including religious figures and business signage.  His work has been shown at the Venice Biennale and at the Centre Pompidou in Paris, among other venues.  Some of his work is in the collection of the Horniman Museum in London.

References

1940 births
Living people
20th-century Nigerian sculptors
21st-century sculptors
20th-century Nigerian male artists
21st-century Nigerian male artists
Male sculptors